Eupithecia fredericki is a moth in the family Geometridae. It is found in North America, including Texas and Wisconsin.

The length of the forewings is about 7.5 mm. The forewings are pale ochreous, with numerous orange  brown scales, especially over the inner half. There are violet-brown patches and spots. The hindwings are pale ochreous, banded with violet-brown. Adults have been recorded on wing in May and August.

References

Moths described in 1985
fredericki
Moths of North America